Noah Joel Sarenren Bazee (born 21 August 1996) is a German professional footballer who plays as a right winger for Bundesliga club FC Augsburg.

Club career
Sarenren Bazee grew up in Walle near Celle, where he played for several clubs. In 2011, he moved to the Hanover region for TSV Havelse. In 2013, he moved to Hannover 96. He played in the Under 19 Bundesliga and the Regionalliga Nord before making his debut on 8 April 2016 against Hertha BSC both in the squad, and together with Waldemar Anton also in the starting lineup.

On 18 June 2019, FC Augsburg announced that they had signed Bazee for the upcoming season. He penned a five-year contract.

On 24 May 2020, Bazee came on as a substitute against Schalke 04 in the 59th minute and scored his first goal for Augsburg, in a 3–0 victory.

International career

Sarenren Bazee is eligible to represent Nigeria through his father and Germany through his mother. He has been approached by the coach of the Nigerian team, Gernot Rohr, to switch his allegiance to Nigeria. He was named to the Nigeria squad for the March 2017 friendlies against Senegal and Burkina Faso.

References

1996 births
Living people
German sportspeople of Nigerian descent
German footballers
Footballers from Lower Saxony
Association football forwards
Bundesliga players
2. Bundesliga players
Regionalliga players
Hannover 96 players
Hannover 96 II players
FC Augsburg players